White Stuff is a British fashion and lifestyle brand that sells women’s, men’s and kids' clothing, accessories, homeware and gifts in over 120 shops in the United Kingdom, shops in Germany, via mail-order catalogues and through its website. The brand has become known for its traditional British styles, idiosyncratic boutique stores and innovative marketing campaigns.
White Stuff was founded in 1985 when two friends, George Treves and Sean Thomas, decided to form a business to fund their love for skiing. Starting under the name “Boys from the White Stuff”, their printed T-shirts and sweatshirts became instantly popular in the alpine region of Val d'Isère. The pair opened the first White Stuff Clothing store in London in 1991.

History
White Stuff was founded in 1985 by two friends, George Treves and Sean Thomas. Keen skiers, the pair decided to work together to find a way of funding their passion. They devised a business plan to sell T-shirts with abstract motifs that would appeal to skiers. They thought up the name "Boys from the White Stuff" – a play on the title of the popular film and TV series “Boys from the Blackstuff” by Alan Bleasdale. Sean Thomas sold the initial batch of 100 T-shirts very quickly in the company’s inaugural year, while George Treves stayed at home in the UK to work on a course at catering college.

The following season, they began printing sweatshirts as well as T-shirts which, according to Treves, “started to gain Alpine kudos as a grass roots level; it had an aspirational value for holidaymakers who had seen ski workers wearing it”. Treves and Thomas toured the French Alpine ski resort town of Val d'Isère, selling their products in hotels and bars from a suitcase. During the off-seasons, when they could not sell their garments, Treves worked as a decorator and Thomas as a driver.

At the turn of the 21st Century, Treves and Thomas were continuing to design White Stuff’s clothing lines. In February 2004 Thomas and Treves hired Sally Bailey, former Brand Director of Miss Selfridge, to help develop the brand. Over the next five years, Bailey moved the White Stuff label away from its original image as a winter wear retailer to begin focusing on a more bohemian, urban audience. Bailey stepped down from her position as CEO in 2013 and was replaced by Jeremy Seigal, formerly of Watson and The Perfume Shop. In 2018, Jo Jenkins, previously at Marks and Spencer joined the company as CEO.
By 2018, the company had grown to have more than 115 stores across England, Wales, Scotland and Northern Ireland, including stores in Guernsey and Isle of Man. White Stuff is also available in many House of Fraser and John Lewis stores in the UK, and in Germany as part of Karstadt.

White Stuff Foundation
The White Stuff Foundation was founded in May 2010, in celebration of the company's 25th anniversary. Today the foundation is based in Lambeth, London. White Stuff Clothing stated their aim to fulfil 25 pledges to show White Stuff's social and environmental commitments, and in particular aims at helping disadvantaged young people. The first of the White Stuff’s pledges was the creation of a charitable foundation, into which White Stuff donate 1% of their annual profits.

Currently the White Stuff Foundation supports more than 100 small and local charities in the UK. These are predominantly in the urban areas close to White Stuff's stores and distribution centres, and every branch of White Stuff is partnered with its own charity. The White Stuff Foundation also supports two charities in India and two in Denmark. Donations accepted by the White Stuff Foundation go towards supporting these partner charities.

White Stuff stores are responsible for hosting their own fundraising events. This has led to the creation of many campaigns, including Surf Relief, Give a Gnome a Home, National Wear a Tea Cosy on Your Head Day and Charity Flip Flops, as well as local events, such as bake sales and raffles throughout each year. White Stuff stores will also sell the props used as part of their window displays at the end of every season, with proceeds going to the White Stuff Foundation.

Stores
In 1991, the first White Stuff shop was opened in Clapham, London. White Stuff boutiques are, according to the company website, “more than just shops, they are places where people can meet and socialise.” White Stuff regularly hosts events inside its stores (including the regular White Stuff Book Club), allows customers to bring pets inside with them, and has dedicated areas for children with colouring books and dens. Some White Stuff stores include their own cinemas, pick ‘n’ mix counters and bespoke changing rooms decorated in themed styles.

White Stuff has more than 100 stores including Edinburgh, Nottingham, Manchester and Battersea.

References

External links 
White Stuff Clothing Website
White Stuff Foundation

Clothing retailers of the United Kingdom
Clothing brands